The green transport hierarchy (Canada), street user hierarchy (US), sustainable transport hierarchy (Wales), urban transport hierarchy or road user hierarchy (Australia, UK) is a hierarchy of modes of transport of road users prioritising green transport. It is the basic concept of transport reform groups worldwide. In 2020, the UK government consulted about adding to the Highway Code a road user hierarchy prioritising pedestrians. It is a key characteristic of Australian transport planning.

History
The Green Transportation Hierarchy: A Guide for Personal & Public Decision-Making by Chris Bradshaw was first published September 1994 and revised June 2004. It was first prepared for Ottawalk and the Transportation Working Committee of the Ottawa-Carleton Round-table on the Environment in January 1992, only stating 'Walk, Cycle, Bus, Truck, Car'.

Factors
Mode
Energy source
Trip length
Trip speed
Vehicle size
Passenger load factor
Trip segment
Trip purpose
Traveller

Adoption
The author directed the hierarchy at both individual lifestyle choices and public authorities who should officially direct their resources; funds, moral suasion, and formal sanctions – based on the factors.

Bradshaw described the hierarchy to be logical, but the effect of applying it will seem radical.

The model rejects the concept of the balanced transportation system, where users are assumed to be free to choose between many options. This is because choices incorporating factors that are ranked low generally have a high impact on other choices.

See also

Bill Boaks campaigned for pedestrian priority everywhere
Complete streets
Induced demand
Jaywalking
Planetizen
Priority (right of way)
Road hierarchy
Road traffic safety

Settlement hierarchy
Street hierarchy
Sustainable transport
Traffic bottleneck
Traffic code
Traffic conflict
Traffic flow
Transportation demand management

References

External links
Original 1992 paper

Climate change policy
Rules of the road
Sustainable transport
1992 documents 
1994 books
1992 in transport
Hierarchy